Peach Creek is an unincorporated community and census-designated place (CDP) in Logan County, West Virginia, United States. Peach Creek is located on the east bank of the Guyandotte River across from West Logan. Peach Creek has a post office with ZIP code 25639. The community was first listed as a CDP prior to the 2020 census.

The community took its name from Peach Creek, which flows through the center of town.

References

Census-designated places in West Virginia
Census-designated places in Logan County, West Virginia
Unincorporated communities in Logan County, West Virginia
Unincorporated communities in West Virginia
Populated places on the Guyandotte River